Dominique Sourdel (31 Januar 1921, Pont-Sainte-Maxence – 4 March 2014, Neuilly-sur-Seine) was a French historian who specialized in Medieval Islam.

He was professor of the Paris-Sorbonne University.

Books 
L'Islam (1949), PUF, Que sais-je? nº355, 2002, 21ª ed. aggiornata
 
Le vizirat abbasside de 749 à 936 (132 à 324 de l'Hégire), Damas, PIFD, 1959
La civilisation de l'islam classique, Arthaud « Les Grandes Civilisations », I ediz. 1968, con Janine Sourdel
L'État impérial des califes abbassides, PUF, "Islamiques", 1999
Histoire des arabes (1976), PUF, « Que sais-je ? », nº 1627, 2003
 L'islam médiéval (1979), PUF, "Quadrige", 2005
 
 
Vocabulaire de l'islam (2002), PUF, « Que sais-je ? » nº3653, 2002 con Janine Sourdel
Certificats de pèlerinage d'époque ayyoubide. Contribution à l'histoire de l'idéologie de l'islam au temps des Croisades, Paris, AIBL, 2006

References 

20th-century French historians
French Arabists
1921 births
2014 deaths
Academic staff of Paris-Sorbonne University
People from Oise
French orientalists
French medievalists